Terry Wooden (born January 14, 1967)  is a former American Football linebacker who played for three teams, the Seattle Seahawks, the Kansas City Chiefs, and the Oakland Raiders from 1990 to 1998.

Wooden played college football at Syracuse University and is currently a scout for the New Orleans Saints.  Attended Farmington High School in Connecticut.

References 
Archived New Orleans Saints bio

1967 births
Living people
Players of American football from Hartford, Connecticut
American football linebackers
Syracuse Orange football players
Seattle Seahawks players
Kansas City Chiefs players
Oakland Raiders players
Ed Block Courage Award recipients